The Mee (also Bunani Mee, Ekari, Ekagi, Kapauku) are a people in the Wissel Lakes area of Central Papua, Indonesia. They speak the Ekagi language.

Epidemiological significance
In the 1970s, an investigation was conducted by Indonesian physicians concerned about the high rates of Ekari people hospitalized for burns. The study revealed many Ekari people were suffering from neurocysticercosis, caused by the pork tapeworm, Taenia solium, which had been previously unseen in Papua New Guinea. As a result, many had been suffering seizures while in close proximity to fires, injuring themselves in the process. Pigs infected with the tapeworms had been introduced to the island previously by the Indonesian unknowingly.

Representations in media 
 National Geographic aired the film Tribal Odyssey: The Chief Who Talks to God: The Mee, Papua in 2005 as part of its Tribal Odyssey series.

See also

Indigenous people of New Guinea

References

External links 
 Spirited Fight, The Guardian (2002, UK)

Indigenous ethnic groups in Western New Guinea
Ethnic groups in Indonesia